Civic Auditorium is a name commonly used for a city's auditorium and/or arena:

Canada
Oshawa Civic Auditorium in Oshawa, Ontario
Estevan Civic Auditorium in Estevan, Saskatchewan

United States
Pasadena Civic Auditorium in Pasadena, California
Bill Graham Civic Auditorium (formerly known as the San Francisco Civic Auditorium) in San Francisco, California
San Jose Civic Auditorium in San Jose, California
Santa Cruz Civic Auditorium in Santa Cruz, California
Santa Monica Civic Auditorium in Santa Monica, California
Stockton Memorial Civic Auditorium in Stockton, California
Welsh Auditorium (formerly known as Civic Auditorium), in Grand Rapids, Michigan
Civic Auditorium (Clarksdale, Mississippi), a Mississippi Landmark
Omaha Civic Auditorium in Omaha, Nebraska
Albuquerque Civic Auditorium in Albuquerque, New Mexico
The Dalles Civic Auditorium in The Dalles, Oregon
Keller Auditorium (formerly known as the Portland Civic Auditorium) in Portland, Oregon
Mechanics Bank Theater and Convention Center (formerly known as the Civic Auditorium) in Bakersfield, California
La Porte Civic Auditorium in La Porte, Indiana